Euchiton involucratus, the common cudweed, is an herb in the tribe Gnaphalieae within the family Asteraceae. It is native to Australia and New Zealand and sparingly naturalized in a few scattered locations in the United States (California + Massachusetts).

Euchiton involucratus is a biennial or perennial herb up to 40 cm (16 inches) tall, spreading by means of stolons running along the surface of the ground. Stems are usually unbranched, covered with white woolly hairs. Leaves are narrowly lance-shaped, green and shiny on the top side, white and woolly underneath. The plant produces flower heads in a hemispheric cluster at the top of the plant, frequently with smaller clusters in the axils of the leaves. Each head is cylindrical, with brown or copper-colored bracts on the outside. It has 80-150 pistillate flowers around the edge of the head plus 3-7 bisexual florets toward the center.

References

Gnaphalieae
Flora of New Zealand
Flora of Australia
Plants described in 1756